Traubia is a genus of Chilean plants in the Amaryllis family. Only one species is recognized, Traubia modesta, native to northern and central Chile.

Traubia is included in tribe Hippeastreae, subtribe Traubiinae.

References

External links
 Traubia modesta at Chilebosque

Amaryllidoideae
Monotypic Amaryllidaceae genera
Endemic flora of Chile